A tughra is a calligraphic monogram, seal or signature of a sultan that was affixed to all official documents and correspondence. Inspired by the tamgha, it was also carved on his seal and stamped on the coins minted during his reign. Very elaborate decorated versions were created for important documents that were also works of art in the tradition of Ottoman illumination, such as the example of Suleiman the Magnificent in the gallery below.

The tughra was designed at the beginning of the sultan's reign and drawn by the court calligrapher or nişancı on written documents. The first tughra examples are from the 14th century.

Tughras served a purpose similar to the cartouche in ancient Egypt or the Royal Cypher of British monarchs. Every Ottoman sultan had his own individual tughra.

Etymology
There are two main schools of thought on the origins of the word tughra. The first sees it derived from a Turkic secretarial emblem called tughragh, and the second as an effort by Persian scribes to shape the name of the ruler into a bow-like element called turgha/turghay, subsequently mispronounced as tughra.

The primary argument for the first school is a remark by Mahmud al-Kashgari in his Dīwān Lughāt al-Turk:

Visual elements of a tughra

The tughra has a characteristic form, two loops on the left side, three vertical lines in the middle,  stacked writing on the bottom and two extensions to the right. Each of these elements has a specific meaning, and together they make up the form that is easily recognizable as a tughra. 

The name of the sultan is written out in the bottom section, called a sere. Depending on the period, this name can be as simple as Orhan, son of Osman, in the first tughra in 1326. In later periods honorifics and prayers are also added to the name of the tughra holder and his father.

The loops to the left of the tughra are called beyze, from Arabic meaning egg. Some interpretations of tughra design claim that the beyzes are supposed to symbolize the two seas the sultans held sway over: the outer larger loop signifying the Mediterranean and the inner, smaller loop signifying the Black Sea.

The vertical lines on the top of the tughra are called tuğ, or flagstaff. The three tugs signify independence. The S-shaped lines crossing the tugs are called zülfe and they, together with the tops of the tugs that also look to the right, signify that the winds blow from the east to the west, the traditional movement of the Ottomans.

The lines to the right of the tughra are called hançer and signify a sword, symbol of power and might.

Tughras of the Ottoman sultans

Other tughras 
Although the tughra is largely identified with the Ottoman Sultans, they have also sometimes been used in other states, such as the Qajar dynasty, Safavid Empire and the Khanate of Kazan. Later, tughras were used among the Tatars of Imperial Russia.

The Mughal Emperors are also known to have used calligraphic symbols, alongside the Ottomans, the Mughal "Tughra" was circular in shape with three points at its tip, beside the calligraphic signature of the emperor.

Afghan currency notes from 1919 to 1936 had the tughra present as well. Pakistan had the tughra on it coins from 1947 till 1974; both of these are present in the State Bank Museum in Karachi. The nawab of Bahawalpur and the Nizam of Hyderabad had tugras on their coinage as well. The flowing lines could symbolize the wide reach of Suleyman's rule and his future conquests. It could also signify the spread of Islam to other realms beyond the Ottoman Empire.

Post-imperial interpretations
There are modern artists of calligraphy that use the characteristic tughra form today. Examples are the tughras of Russian president Vladimir Putin and Akihito, the Emperor of Japan, created by artist Vladimir Popov.

See also
Culture of the Ottoman Empire
Gallipoli Star
Islamic calligraphy
Huaya, stylised calligraphic signatures used in East Asia
Khelrtva, stylised calligraphic signatures used in Georgia
Ottoman Emperors family tree
Ottoman Dynasty
Ottoman family tree (more detailed)
Line of succession to the Ottoman throne
List of sultans of the Ottoman Empire
List of Valide Sultans
Postage stamps and postal history of Turkey
Rota (papal signature)
Totem

References

External links

Ottoman Sultan Tughras
Modern Ceramics with Tughra
  Andreas Birken, "The Tughra of Sultan Abdülaziz (1861-76)", Peshawar Stamp Society

Islamic calligraphy
Ottoman culture
Monograms
Signature